Kasatkin is a rural locality (a khutor) in Dukmasovskoye Rural Settlement of Shovgenovsky District, the Republic of Adygea, Russia. The population was 135 as of 2018. There are 3 streets.

Geography 
Kasatkin is located 36 km southwest of Khakurinokhabl (the district's administrative centre) by road. Mamatsev is the nearest rural locality.

References 

Rural localities in Shovgenovsky District